The Barcelona Royal Shipyard is a shipyard and former military building of Gothic architecture placed at the Port Vell area of the Port of Barcelona. Nowadays it houses the Barcelona Maritime Museum. Construction started during the 13th century under the rule of Peter III of Aragon. During excavations in 2012
it was discovered that in the late 16th century a new building was constructed on top of the old medieval dockyard, giving the building its current structure. This excavations also uncovered a Roman graveyard. The shipyard's restoration was finished in early 2013. The museum was reopened in 2014.

History

The construction of the dockyards was done in several stages, spanning over four centuries:
 13th century: There is reference to an old shipyard in a document dated 1241, when James I of Aragon ordered that no house or structure should be built on the coastline between the city walls and "the ataszana, which is to the west”.
 13th century: This period of construction started with the War of the Sicilian Vespers. In 1285, Peter III of Aragon ordered the construction of the shipyard, a rectangular fortification with no roof consisting of fortified walls and four towers, of which two still exist. The shipyard opened to the east.
 14th century: This expansion comprises the period from 1328 to 1390. The city walls were expanded and included the shipyard inside the fortified city. A roof was added to prevent the degradation of the galleys stored during winter.
 15th century: Construction started in 1390 and lasted until 1415. A new area, was added to the building. This part of the shipyard is also known as  The area was meant to be a royal palace, but the idea was finally discarded. Excavation shows that only the foundations for the palace were built.
 16th century: The medieval building was replaced by a new dockyard a few meters inland. The new shipyards continue to use Gothic architecture, since it had proven to be the most practical and reliable at the time, This decision, however, managed to confuse historians trying to date the building. The construction of the new dockyards and the move inland was caused by the construction of the city's port during the 15th century. The new port had changed the currents and moved the shore inland, causing severe flooding in the old medieval building.
 17th century: In 1612, the Catalan government decided to add three naves to the building. Following the Catalan Revolt (1640–1652) the Spanish government further amplified the shipyard both as an arsenal and a barracks.
 18th century: In 1725, Two more barracks were constructed, one for cavalry and one for infantry. These barracks were torn down in 1935.

From the beginning, the aim of the shipyard was to build the galleys for the Aragonese Armada. The shipyard was also a naval arsenal, which was used to store galleys and all the rigging and apparatus needed. The arsenal also produced a great deal of material, both sails and cordages for the ships and arms for the men. Naval arsenals of the time, normally, had to produce and store food also.

After the 1381 renovation, the building had eight naves, 8.4 m high and 8.4 m wide. The naves were, approximately, 60 m long, consisting of 17 columns 77 cm wide and 6 m high. Thanks to a written record of the time we know that four new storage areas were built. Ashlar from the nearby mountain of Montjuïc was used for the construction, with sand from the beach in front of the shipyard, wood from the Baix Ebre and Gavarres, and ropes and tiles from Valencia. During the rule of Alfonso V of Aragon, the shipyard experienced its highest activity. In 1423, twelve galleys were built simultaneously. In 1571, the royal galley of John of Austria, commonly known as the Real, was built at the shipyard. This galley was the flagship at the Battle of Lepanto. There is a reproduction of this galley at the Barcelona Maritime Museum.

During the 18th century, the shipbuilding was moved to the Cartagena shipyard, and after the War of Spanish Succession the site was used as an artillery barrack for the Spanish Army. The building was used to build, store, and repair artillery pieces. In 1935,  the building was given to the Barcelona city hall who decide to use it as a maritime museum, which opened in 1941. On 5 May 1976, the building was declared a Cultural Site of National Interest.

Metro
The closest subway/tube station is Drassanes, which is the Catalan word for shipyard, in the  line of the Barcelona Metro network.

See also
 Catalan Gothic

References

Bibliography
Volum 3 (1998), Art de Catalunya, Urbanisme, arquitectura civil i industrial, Barcelona, Edicions L'isard. 
Volum III (2003), L'Art Gòtic a Catalunya, Arquitectura III, Barcelona, Enciclopèdia Catalana. 
Volum 7 (2004), La Gran Enciclopèdia en català, Barcelona, Edicions 62.

External links

Restoration of the Drassanes Reials 

Buildings and structures completed in the 13th century
Buildings and structures in Barcelona
Museums in Barcelona
Gothic architecture in Catalonia
Maritime museums in Spain
Shipyards of Spain